In mathematics, the Neukirch–Uchida theorem shows that all problems about algebraic number fields can be reduced to problems about their absolute Galois groups.
 showed that two algebraic number fields with the same absolute Galois group are isomorphic, and  strengthened this by proving Neukirch's conjecture that automorphisms of the algebraic number field correspond to outer automorphisms of its absolute Galois group.  extended the result to infinite fields that are finitely generated over prime fields.

The Neukirch–Uchida theorem is one of the foundational results of anabelian geometry, whose main theme is to reduce properties of geometric objects to properties of their fundamental groups, provided these fundamental groups are sufficiently non-abelian.

References
 

 

Theorems in algebraic number theory